Acrolepiopsis orchidophaga is a moth of the family Acrolepiidae. It was described by Sigeru Moriuti in 1982. It is found in Japan.

The wingspan is 8.5–10 mm.

References

Moths described in 1982
Acrolepiidae
Moths of Japan